The International Day for the Abolition of Slavery is a yearly event on December 2, organized since 1986 by the United Nations General Assembly.

The Convention for the Suppression of the Traffic in Persons and of the Exploitation of the Prostitution of Others was approved by the United Nations General Assembly on December 2, 1949. Besides, by resolution 57/195 of 18 December 2002, the Assembly proclaimed 2004 the International Year to Commemorate the Struggle against Slavery and its Abolition.

See also 
International Day for the Abolition of Slavery from DAG Scher Library
International Day for the Remembrance of the Slave Trade and its Abolition

Notes

External links 

 UN: International Day for the Abolition of Slavery

United Nations days
Abolitionism
December observances